Hvidovre Idrætsforening, more commonly known as Hvidovre IF is a Danish professional football club based in Hvidovre. The club competes in the Danish 1st Division, the second tier of Danish football, and plays its home matches at the Hvidovre Stadion. 

Formed in 1925, the club has been crowned Danish champions three times, in 1966, 1973 and 1981, and have won the Danish Cup once, in 1980.

Current squad 
As of 19 January 2023

Former players 

  Tadeusz Gapiński
  Per Steffensen
  Peter Schmeichel

Honours 
Danish Champions: 1966, 1973, 1981
 Runner-up: 1971
 Third Place: 1970.
Danish Cup:
 Winners: 1980

Achievements 
 19 seasons in the Highest Danish League
 16 seasons in the Second Highest Danish League
 12 seasons in the Third Highest Danish League

References

External links 
 Hvidovre IF website

 
Association football clubs established in 1925
Football clubs in Denmark
Hvidovre Municipality
1925 establishments in Denmark